The Sephardic Center of Mill Basin, is a Sephardic Jewish Orthodox Sephardi synagogue located at 6208 Strickland Avenue in Brooklyn, New York. It is primarily used by Jews residing in the Mill Basin, Georgetown and Bergen Beach neighborhoods of Brooklyn.

Leadership
Currently, the synagogue is under the leadership of Rabbi Yitzhak Israeli.

See also
Syrian Jewish communities of the United States

External links
Official website

Mill Basin, Brooklyn
Synagogues in Brooklyn
Orthodox synagogues in New York City
Sephardi Jewish culture in New York City
Syrian-American culture in New York City
Syrian-Jewish culture in New York (state)